Timema poppense (originally spelled "poppensis", but this spelling did not match the gender of the genus Timema, and therefore has undergone a mandatory change following ICZN Article 31.2), the "Pope Valley timema", is a species of walkingstick in the family Timematidae. It is found in California, and originally described from a nature reserve in the Pope Valley.

References

Further reading

External links

 

Phasmatodea
Insects described in 1999